Francesc Antich Oliver (born November 28, 1958) is a Venezuelan-born Spanish politician, who was the President of the Balearic Islands between 1999 and 2003, and 2007 and 2011. He also was the Secretary General of the Socialist Party of the Balearic Islands, a branch of the SSWP.

He was born in Caracas to Spanish emigrants from Venezuela.

References

1958 births
Living people
Members of the 8th Congress of Deputies (Spain)
Members of the 9th Senate of Spain
Members of the 10th Senate of Spain
Members of the 11th Senate of Spain
Members of the 12th Senate of Spain
Members of the 13th Senate of Spain
Members of the Parliament of the Balearic Islands
People from Caracas
Presidents of the Balearic Islands
Spanish Socialist Workers' Party politicians
Venezuelan emigrants to Spain